Reggie Williams (born July 23, 1983, in Lake Charles, Louisiana) is a former professional Canadian football wide receiver. He was signed by the Calgary Stampeders as a street free agent in 2008. He played college football for the LSU Tigers.

External links
Calgary Stampeders bio

1983 births
Living people
Sportspeople from Lake Charles, Louisiana
American players of Canadian football
Canadian football wide receivers
LSU Tigers football players
Calgary Stampeders players
Players of American football from Louisiana